Stephen Paul John (born 22 December 1966) is an English former professional footballer who played in the Football League as a defender.

References

1966 births
Living people
People from Brentwood, Essex
English footballers
Association football defenders
Leyton Orient F.C. players
English Football League players